Jesse Gause (1785 – c. 1836) was an early leader in The Church of Jesus Christ of Latter-day Saints and served in the First Presidency as a counselor to church president Joseph Smith. For decades Gause was generally unknown to LDS historians, and so could be considered the Church’s lost counselor of the First Presidency. It was only in the 1980s that research identified his rightful place among early Church leaders.

Quaker and Shaker years
The son of William Gause and Mary Beverly, Gause was born in 1785 in East Marlborough, Chester County, Pennsylvania. Gause followed the faith of his parents and in 1806, apparently still single at twenty-one, he requested and was received into the Society of Friends, becoming a Quaker. 

Although a Quaker in good standing, Gause's Quaker pacificism did not prevent him from joining the Delaware militia in 1814 during the War of 1812. Upon leaving the military in 1815 he moved to Wilmington, Delaware, where he married Martha Johnson. In 1822, the family finally settled in Chester County where he became a teacher in a Quaker school. Martha died in 1828 after the birth of their fourth child. 

In the same year of Martha's death, Gause married a woman named Minerva, and they settled in Hancock, Massachusetts. Shortly after the birth of a daughter, Gause resigned from the Quakers on January 30, 1829, and joined the Shakers. Gause's new wife followed him, apparently accepting the Shaker practice of sexual abstinence even for married couples. In 1831, Gause, his wife, and infant daughter moved to the Shaker community near North Union, Ohio, leaving Martha's four children in the care of his sister, who was also a Shaker.

The Church of Jesus Christ of Latter Day Saints years
At the same time that Gause was moving to North Union, Latter Day Saints from New York were also emigrating to Ohio, settling in the environs of Kirtland, some fifteen miles east of North Union. It is not known when Gause came into contact with these new settlers, but some time after October 1831 he was baptized; this time his wife refused to follow him. Gause rose quickly to a position of prominence in his new faith; in an early record book it states that on March 8, 1832, Joseph Smith "[c]hose this day and ordained brother Jesse Gause and Broth[er] Sidney [Rigdon] to be my counsellors of the ministry of the presidency of the High Priesthood".  A week later, Smith received a revelation concerning Gause's selection as a counselor in what later became known as the First Presidency, as well as giving him additional instructions concerning his new assignment.  Smith may have chosen a recent convert for such a responsible position due to Gause's experience with the Shaker communal society, because the Latter Day Saints had recently commenced their own communal experiment, the Law of Consecration. Both Gause and Smith's other counselor, Sidney Rigdon, had previous experience living in communal societies. 

Gause settled into his new role, accompanying Smith to Jackson County, Missouri, between April and June 1832, in order to set up the Law of Consecration. Upon returning to Kirtland, Gause started on a mission with Zebedee Coltrin on August 1, 1832. The two missionaries traveled to North Union, where six days later Gause attempted to persuade Minerva to accept Mormonism, but she continued to refuse to join him. He then attempted unsuccessfully to take their daughter, but had to leave "very much [e]nraged." Within a short time, Coltrin became ill and decided to return to Kirtland. The two men "parted in the fellowship of the gospel" on August 20. From this date Gause simply disappears from Church history. It is not known what occurred to sour him on Mormonism, but by the end of 1832 he had "denied the faith" and was probably the "Bro. Jesse" recorded as excommunicated on December 3, 1832.

Gause's role in Church history went unacknowledged for decades. The revelation given to him in 1832 was altered by replacing his name with his replacement in the First Presidency, Frederick G. Williams. His name was only recognized in the 1980 edition of the Doctrine and Covenants, but then only in the historical introduction to the revelation; his replacement's name remained in the text itself. Only after historians demonstrated his role in the formation of the Church hierarchy, beginning with Robert J. Woodford in 1975 and D. Michael Quinn in 1983, was his name restored to the church's list of general authorities.

Later years
Gause's activities after 1832 are not known. Apparently he did not rejoin Minerva at North Union, but may have returned to Chester County to be near his other children. By 1836, when he would have been 51 years old, he had died at Montgomery, Chester County, Pennsylvania. In that year his brother assumed the guardianship of Martha's children. However, his sister stated in 1873 that Gause "died away from his family", suggesting that he died estranged from his children.

Notes

References
 Black, Susan Easton, Who's Who in the Doctrine and Covenants, Bookcraft, Salt Lake City, Utah, 1997, pp. 100–101.
 Deseret News 1987 Church Almanac, Deseret News, Salt Lake City, Utah, 1986, p. 49 (The first listing of Gause's name as a counselor in this quasi-official LDS almanac series.)
 Jennings, Erin B., "The Consequential Counselor: Restoring the Root(s) of Jesse Gause," Journal of Mormon History, 34 (2) 2008, pp. 182–227.

 Quinn, D. Michael, The Mormon Hierarchy: Origins of Power, Signature Books, Salt Lake City, Utah, 1994, pp. 41–42, 191, 463, 546–547, 618–619.
.
15 March 1832 appointment of Jesse Gause as a counselor to Joseph Smith
Biography of Jesse Gause, The Joseph Smith Papers (accessed December 30, 2011)

1785 births
1830s deaths
American Quakers
Converts to Mormonism from Quakerism
Converts to Quakerism
Counselors in the First Presidency (LDS Church)
Date of birth unknown
Date of death unknown
Doctrine and Covenants people
Former Latter Day Saints
Leaders in the Church of Christ (Latter Day Saints)
People excommunicated by the Church of Christ (Latter Day Saints)
People from East Marlborough Township, Pennsylvania
Religious leaders from Pennsylvania
People from Berkshire County, Massachusetts
Shaker members
Former Shakers